Varg may most commonly refer to:

 Warg, a fictional demonic wolf created by author J. R. R. Tolkien
 An anglicised form of Old Norse vargr, relating to wolves in Germanic mythology

Varg or VARG may also refer to:

People with the name
 Bert-Åke Varg,  Swedish actor and singer
 Inga Varg (born 1952), Swedish architect
 Paul A. Varg (1912–1994), American historian

 Varg Støvland,  Norwegian footballer 
 Varg Veum, a character created by the Norwegian author Gunnar Staalesen
 Varg Vikernes (born 1973), Norwegian musician and writer

Fictional characters
Detective Varg, a character created by Alexander McCall Smith
Verg Veum, a character created by Norwegian author Gunnar Staalesen

Other
 Varg (band), a German heavy metal band
 Varg, Iran, a village in Shirvan County, Iran
VARG, ICAO code for Ratnagiri Airport, India

See also

 Varga (disambiguation)
 Warg (disambiguation)